The Hyperion XP-1 is a hydrogen-powered one-off sports car developed and manufactured by American California-based automobile manufacturer Hyperion Motors. Unveiled to the public on August 12, 2020, it is the first one-off car built by the brand.

Specifications 
The XP-1 is touted by Hyperion to be the first hydrogen-powered "supercar" and has a top range of 1016 miles, assuming that 55% of the driving is city and 45% is on the highway. The XP-1's curb weight comes out to 1248 kg (2751 lb), typical of many other petrol-powered supercars in that field, due to an ultra-light carbon-titanium monocoque chassis. The 1016-mile range of the XP-1 is possible due to a bigger hydrogen tank than other hydrogen-powered vehicles such as the Toyota Mirai, or the Honda Clarity. The CEO of Hyperion Motors, Angelo Kafantaris, wants to make an infrastructure of hydrogen-refueling stations, similar to Tesla's Supercharger network. However, there will be fewer stations to recharge tanks of hydrogen due to the long range of the XP-1. The XP-1 is powered by 4 electric motors, one at each wheel, which by the main fuel cell, making it capable of a top speed of 221 mph (356 km/h) and a 0 to 60 mph (100 km/h) time of 2.2 seconds. The XP-1 comes with a 3-speed automatic transmission, and huge amounts of power are possible through ultracapacitors, which help increase the power output of the fuel cell to the electric motors.

Design 
The XP-1 took nearly a decade of development from the design to actual feasibility. The body includes active aerodynamic elements that double as solar panels to get more energy. The double-barrel exhaust stacks allow deionized water vapor to come out as the only exhaust. The interior of the XP-1 features a 98-inch display that can be controlled by hand gestures, along with a 134-inch glass canopy. The V-wing doors are inspired by the "Winged Victory of Samothrace," according to Hyperion Motors.

Production 
The XP-1 is scheduled to go into production in 2022, with a limited run of 300 units.

References

External links 
 Hyperion XP-1

Sports cars